The Lifeshape Foundation is a charitable organization founded by John and Trudy Cathy White. Lifeshape was launched in 2003 to facilitate the holistic development of young women and men who have a passionate walk and authentic personal relationship with Christ. Lifeshape was established to help lead these young people to understand, explain and live their faith.

The nonprofit supports Lifeshape International, Lifeshape Brasil & Impact 360 Institute.

References

External links
 Lifeshape
Lifeshape International
Lifeshape Brasil
Impact 360 Institute

Christian charities based in the United States
Charities based in Georgia (U.S. state)